Boistfort is an unincorporated community in the northwest United States, in Lewis County, Washington, about  southwest of Chehalis. The original one-room school in Boistfort was established in 1853 and was the first school district in Lewis County and the Territory of Washington.

History
A post office in the area was established in 1857. Originally named Baw Faw Prairie, it would be changed to Boisfort, then to an official spelling Boistfort, meaning "strong wood or heavy forest" or "small valley surrounded by green hills". The community took its name from nearby Boistfort Prairie (Valley).

In 1900 Boistfort had a store, a barber, church, a blacksmith shop, and a meeting hall. Boistfort High School was built in 1912 and closed in 1976.

Boistfort was home to hop fields owned by Herman Klaber, who had a small mansion now known as the Boistfort Mansion. He died on the Titanic in 1912 and his hop yards shut down soon afterwards.

Notable test pilot Scott Crossfield (1921–2006) moved to the area in his teens and graduated from Boistfort High School in 1939. He was the first to travel at twice the speed of sound (1953), and piloted the first flights of the North American X-15 (1959).

Government and politics

Politics

Boistfort is recognized as being majority Republican and conservative.

The results for the 2020 U.S. Presidential Election for the Boistfort voting district were as follows:

 Donald J. Trump (Republican) - 181 (71.54%)
 Joe Biden (Democrat) - 65 (25.69%)
 Jo Jorgensen (Libertarian) - 4 (1.58%)
 Howie Hawkins (Green) - 1 (0.40%)
 Write-in candidate - 2 (0.79%)

References

Unincorporated communities in Washington (state)
Unincorporated communities in Lewis County, Washington
1857 establishments in Washington Territory